The Snow Man was an 1899 French short silent comedy film by Georges Méliès.

Méliès appeared in the film as a policeman interacting with a snowman. Snowmen had been a popular feature in winter-themed stage entertainment in the decades preceding the film, and an actuality film depicting children making a snowman had appeared as far back as 1896.

The film was sold by Méliès's Star Film Company and is numbered 225 in its catalogues, where it was advertised as a scène comique (comic scene). Méliès burned the original camera negatives of his films late in life; The Snow Man is among the films currently presumed lost.

References

External links
 

French black-and-white films
Films directed by Georges Méliès
French silent short films
Fictional snowmen
1890s French films